The enzyme phosphatidylinositol-3-phosphatase (EC 3.1.3.64) catalyzes the reaction

1-phosphatidyl-1D-myo-inositol 3-phosphate + H2O  1-phosphatidyl-1D-myo-inositol + phosphate

This enzyme belongs to the family of hydrolases, specifically those acting on phosphoric monoester bonds.  The systematic name is 1-phosphatidyl-1D-myo-inositol-3-phosphate 3-phosphohydrolase. Other names in common use include inositol-1,3-bisphosphate 3-phosphatase, inositol 1,3-bisphosphate phosphatase, inositol-polyphosphate 3-phosphatase, D-myo-inositol-1,3-bisphosphate 3-phosphohydrolase, and phosphatidyl-3-phosphate 3-phosphohydrolase.  This enzyme participates in inositol phosphate metabolism and phosphatidylinositol signaling system.

Structural studies

References

 
 

EC 3.1.3
Enzymes of known structure